This is a list of all the football players that have played for Red Star Belgrade (FK Crvena zvezda) since its foundation in 1945.

There are included the players that have played at least one match in any of the following competitions: the domestic league, domestic cup and European competitions.

The players, which played only in unofficial games or were on a trial, are not included.

The numbers include league stats.

.

A
 Milenko Ačimovič                    139/46    (1998-2002)
 Đorđe Aćimović                        2/0     (1989-90,1991-92)
 Jovan Aćimović                      318/56    (1965-76)
 Goran Adamović                        1/0     (2006-08)
 Adilson          16/0      (1998-99)
 Lee Addy                             37/0     (2010-11)
 Ivan Adžić                          143/14    (1989-96)
 Luka Adžić                          39/9      (2016-18)
 Aílton    15/4      (2006-07)
 Duško Ajder     1/0 (1976-79)
 Milorad Aleksić 0/0
 Veljko Aleksić     14/2 (1966-67)
 Stevan Andrejević    3/1 (1975)
 Svetozar Andrejić          44/4 (1961-66)
 Dušan Andrić               15/1 (1964)
 Dušan Anđelković          141/6 (2005-08,2015-18)
 Jovan Anđelković            22/3 (1962-63)
 Darko Anić                  29/5 (1996-97)
 Nikola Antić                 2/0 (2014)
 Sava Antić                   12/4 (1948-50)
 Zoran Antonijević            242/33 (1967-75)
 Aleksandar Aranđelović       6/2 (1946-47)
 Jovo Aranitović               2/0 (1996-97)
 Miguel Araujo                  6/0 (2013-14)
 Milan Arnejčič               15/3 (1969-70)
 Nathaniel Asamoah            15/1 (2012-13)
 Branislav Atanacković 1 (1972-77)
 Todor Atanaskov (Svetozar "Toza" Atanacković)  10/3 (1946-48)
 Daniel Avramovski        13/1 (2014-16)
 Irakli Azarovi 6/0 (2022-)

B
 Eli Babalj   8/1 (2012-13)
 Dragoš Babić  1/0 (1963)
 Milan Babić  23/0 (1975-79)
 Srđan Babić  79/7 (2017-20)
 David Babunski 13/0 (2016)
 Filip Bainović 2/0 (2017-18)
 Miloš Bajalica  24/0 (2007)
 Srđan Bajčetić     92/5 (1995,1998-2001)
 Boban Bajković     119 (2004,2008-14)
 Axel Bakayoko 5/0 (2000-22)
 Božidar Bandović  35/3 (1992-95)
 Nebojša Bandović  4/0 (1983-85)
 Zoran Banković   35/3 (1983-85)
 Zoran Banović    19 (2004-08)
 Petar Baralić   134/12 (1973-79)
 Hernán Barcos  17/3 (2007-08)
 Dušan Basta      141/8 (2002-2008)
 Vladimir Beara   110 (1955-60)
 Dejan Bekić     90/3 (1963-67)
 Jovan Beleslin   1/0 (1947-48)
 Nikola Beljić     5/0 (2003-05)
 Miodrag Belodedici    108/3 (1989-92)
 El Fardou Ben 110/57 (2018-)
 Enes Bešić                30/2 (1988-90)
 Misdongard Betoligar     16/4 (2007-08)
 Zoran Bingulac   5/0 (1973)
 Dragiša Binić    80/35 (1987-88,1990-91)
 Milan Biševac            83/3 (2004-06)
 Nikoslav Bjegović        79/0 (1997-2000)
 Cvijetin Blagojević     141/12 (1978-83)
 Đorđe Blašćuk    1/2 (1952)
 Marko Blažić    43/5 (2008-10)
 Richmond Boakye  104/60 (2017,2019-2020)
 Dragan Bogavac           85/14 (2002-05)
 Igor Bogdanović         20/7 (2002-03)
 Vladimir Bogdanović 76/6 (2008-10)
 Jadranko Bogičević 5/0 (2003-05)
 Vladislav Bogićević   237/22 (1968-77)
 Milan Bogunović  1/0
 Elvir Bolić       18/2 (1991-92)
 Cristian Borja   54/17
 Milan Borjan  161/(124)/79 c.s(2017-)
 Zdravko Borovnica      161/24  (1976-82)
 Ranko Borozan    40/3 (1957-59)
 Miloš Bosančić  20/0 (2014)
 Branko Bošković  157/39 (1998-2003)
 Goran Bošković  56/0 (1996-99)
 Miodrag Božović    63/1 (1992-94)
 Milivoj Bračun    35/0 (1986-87)
 Miloš Brajović     1/0 (2013-14)
 Aleksandar Bratić   11/0 (1996-97)
 Vidak Bratić  40/1 (2001-03)
 Grzegorz Bronowicki 22/0 (2007-08)
 Osman Bukari 16/4 (2022-)
 Radosav Bulić 4/0 (2001-02)
 Goran Bunjevčević   169/19 (1997-2001)
 Borisav Burmaz  1/0 (2019)
 Miloš Bursać    37/11 (1988-89)
 Igor Burzanović   62/14 (2007-09)
 Ladislav Butković   3/0 (1953)

C
 Cadú  104/26 (2009-13)
 Jonathan Cafú 9/2 (2018-19)
 José Cañas 21/1(2019-20)
 Segundo Castillo  66/17 (2006-08)
 Dragoljub Cicak 1/0 (1945-51)
 Cléo 24/12 (2008-09)
 Jovan Cokić 97/30 (1948-49,1953-58)
 Kalifa Coulibaly 4/1 (2022-)
 Borislav Cvetković  86/35 (1986-88)
 Draško Cvetković 1/0 (1978-79)
 Ljubomir Cvetković  13/0 (1975-76)
 Miloš Cvetković  33/1 (2015-16)
 Nemanja Cvetković 7/0 (2009-10)

Č
 Zdravko Čakalić 8/0 (1978-83)
 Goran Čaušić  28/1 (2018-19)
 Zvezdan Čebinac 18/3 (1964-65)
 Milan Čop 137/5 (1962-67)
 Slaviša Čula 16/2 (1990-92)

Ć
 Milan Ćalasan 4/0 (1975-77)
Milovan Ćirić 11/4 (1945-46)
 Petar Ćosić 19 (1959-64)
 Uroš Ćosić 21/1 (2011-12)
 Milanko Ćuk 6/0 (1961-62)

D
 Slavko Dacevski  1/0 (1955-56)
 Mirko Dakić 21/0 (1966-68)
 Abiola Dauda    38/17 (2013-14)
 Branko Davidović 61 (1985-89)
 Miloš Degenek 97/3 (2018-19,2019-)
 Vukašin Dević 2/0 (2008)
 Đorđe Despotović 12/2 (2014-15)
 Dragomir Diklić 1/0 (1946-48)
 Dejan Dimitrijević 23/1 (1992-94)
 Miloš Dimitrijević 55/4 (2011-13)
 Vladimir Dimitrijević 1/0 (2001)
 Zoran Dimitrijević 60/2 (1982-87,1988-89)
 Loïs Diony 0/0 (2021-)
 Milorad Diskić 61 (1951-53)
 Vladimir Dišljenković 81 (2001-04)
 Kiril Dojčinovski   252/5 (1967-74)
 Mitchell Donald 107/15 (2015-18)
 Žarko Dragaš 9/2 (1995-96)
 Aleksandar Dragović 52/4 (2022-)
 Milenko Drakulić 45/0 (1945-48)
 Saša Drakulić 11/2 (1993-94)
 Haminu Draman 7/1 (2005-06)
 Miroljub Dramićanin 2/0 (1974-75)
 Božidar Drenovac   44/4 (1945-48)
 Miloš Drizić 19/2 (1980,1989-90)
 Anto Drobnjak   75/43 (1992-94)
 Goran Drulić  92/43 (1995-96,1997-01)
 Ivan Dudić 16/3 (2002-04)
 Ivan Dudić    88/1 (1995-97,1998-00)
 Milan Dudić  142/14 (2002-06)
 Ratomir Dujković  266 (1963-74)
 Darko Dunjić 2/0 (2002-03)
 Vladimir Durković  220/7 (1955-66)
 Mihajlo Dušanović 1/0 (1957-59)

Dž
 Dragan Džajić  389/155 (1963-75,77-78)

Đ / Dj
 Predrag Đajić  202/24 (1945-55)
 Petar Đenić 6/0 (2000-02)
 Ardijan Đokaj 29/5 (2005-06)
 Dušan Đokić 48/24 (2006-07)
 Bratislav Đorđević 37/0 (1973-77)
 Filip Đorđević 15/0 (2005-08)
 Predrag Đorđević 6/0 (1991-93)
 Slavoljub Đorđević 106/0 (2003-05,2009-11)
 Stefan Đorđević 3/0 (2014-15)
 Velimir Đorđević 1/0 (1958)
 Vladimir Đorđević 8/0 (2007-08)
 Vojislav Đorđević 3/0 (1946-48)
 Bojan Djordjic 25/1 (2003-04)
 Ranko Đorđić 82/16 (1981-85)
 Milovan Đorić  176/9 (1967-73)
 Goran Đorović 136/3 (1993-97)
 Zoran Đorović 7/0 (1993-97)
 Goran Đukić 5/0 (2001-02)
 Milivoje Đurđević 75/0 (1945-52)
 Sreten Đurica 22/2 ((1963)
 Petar Đuričković 2/0 (2012-14)
 Konstantin Đurić 15/1 (1982-85)
 Špiro Đurić 3 (1958)
 Žarko Đurović   182/24 (1981-84,1985-89)
 Boško Đurovski  299/59 (1978-89)
 Milko Đurovski  146/65 (1979-86)

E
 Lorenzo Ebecilio 30/3 (2018-19)
 Edgar 10/2 (2008)
 Edson Silva 7/0 (2016)
 Marko Elsner    165/4 (1983-87)
 Strahinja Eraković 18/0 (2019-) 
 Evandro Goebel 49/16 (2011-12)

F
 Diego Falcinelli 20/9 (2020-)
 Filippo Falco 10/4 (2021-)
 Josiesley Ferreira 4/0 (2009)
 Zoran Filipović    263/138  (1969-80)
 Abraham Frimpong 33/1 (2017-18)

G
 Jovan Gajić 10 (1955-58)
 Milan Gajić 56/4(2019-)
 Mateo García 24/5 (2019-20)
 Luis Garrido 10/0 (2013)
 Nenad Gavrić 25/2 (2014-16)
 Željko Gavrić 27/5(2020-)
 Blagoy Georgiev 27/2 (2006-08)
 Blaže Georgioski 43/6 (1999-00)
 Stevo Glogovac 78/3 (1999-02)
 Marko Gobeljić 129/9(2017-)
 Goran Gogić 30/1 (2013-14)
 Jovan Gojković 102/31 (1997-00)
 Slobodan Goračinov 7/1 (1980-84)
 Marko Grujić 41/6 (2012-16)
 Vladan Grujić 3/0 (2002)
 Ibrahima Gueye 77/1 (2006-08)
 Ivan Gvozdenović 169/16 (1999-03)

H
 Stefan Hajdin 10/0 (2018-19,2020)
 Sulejman Halilović 38/24 (1984-85)
 Đura Horvatinović 4/1 (1945-47)
 Dragan Hristovski 3/0 (1974)

I
 Luis Ibáñez 37/11 (2015-16)
 Nikola Ignjatijević 38/2 (2009-11)
 Aleksandar Ilić 1/0 (1990)
 Dejan Ilić 176/11 (1997-02,2003)
 Ivan Ilić 1/0 (2017-19)
 Luka Ilić 11/2(2017-18)
 Mihajlo Ilić 2/0 (1945)
 Momčilo Ilić 4/0 (1957-58)
 Stefan Ilić 1/0 (2016-17)
 Mohammed-Awal Issah 76/2 (2009-11)
 Mirko Ivanić 74/17(2019-)
 Milan Ivanović 35/0 (1985-86,1988)
 Ilija Ivić 109/50 (1991-94)
 Svetislav Ivković 1/0 (1948-49)
 Tomislav Ivković 58 (1983-85)

J
 Dejan Jakovic 4/0 (2008-09)
 Nemanja Jakšić 1/0 (2013-14)
 Jander 15/1 (2019-20)
 Boško Janković   101/27 (2002-06)
 Filip Janković 3/0 (2011-13)
 Milan Janković  198/24 (1980-87)
 Slavoljub Janković 6/0 (1989-90)
 Slobodan Janković  113/28 (1968-69,1970-75)
 Rajko Janjanin  143/33 (1980-84)
 Branko Jelić 82/26 (2000-03)
 Zoran Jelikić  163/8 (1974-81)
 Milan Jeremić 6/0 (2010-11)
 Nenad Jestrović 28/15 (2007-08)
 Dragoslav Jevrić  95 (1995-99)
 Aleksandar Jevtić 62/15 (2009-11)
 Živorad Jevtić    201/5 (1962-75)
 Milan Jevtović 24/6 (2018-20)
 Jovan Jezerkić 84/53 (1945-47,1948-52)
 Erik Jirka 7/0 (2019)
 Dejan Joksimović 28/3 (1987-88,1990-91)
 Nebojša Joksimović 43/1 (2004-07)
 Dušan Jovančić 69/3 (2018-20)
 Milan Jovanović 15/1 (2012-13)
 Milić Jovanović 8 (1990-91)
 Miodrag Mija Jovanović  1/0 (1947-48)
 Nikola Jovanović 179/11 (1975-80)
 Predrag Jovanović 6/0 (1991-92)
 Vukašin Jovanović 35/2 (2014-16)
 Đorđe Jovanovski 1/0 (1977-78)
 Dejan Joveljić 28/14 (2016-19)
 Branko Jovičić 77/3(2017-20)
 Zoran Jovičić  90/51 (1991-93,1995-98)
 Luka Jović 48/13 (2014-16)
 Milan Jovin  174/7 (1978-86)
 Vladimir Jovović 1/0 (2015-16)
 Vladimir Jugović   100/16 (1989-92)
 Goran Jurić   111/0 (1987-91)
 Ivan Jurišić  163/2 (1978-84)

K
 Damir Kahriman 58 (2014-18)
 Boško Kajganić  55 (1967-77)
 Andrija Kaluđerović 55/30 (2010-12)
 Željko Kaluđerović  1 (1987-91)
 Dragan Kanatlarovski   40/13 (1989-90)
 Guélor Kanga     77/16 (2016-18,2020-)
 Kings Kangwa 16/4 (2022-)
 Nikola Karaklajić   1/0 (2013-14)
 Sava Karapandžić   73/0 (1964-71)
 Stanislav Karasi   197/71 (1968-74)
 Filip Kasalica     76/13 (2012-14)
 Mladen Kašanin 65/0 (1945-50)
 Aleksandar Katai    87/41(2014-16,2020-)
 Dejan Kelhar 15/0 (2014)
 Mihalj Keri   263/7 (1968-78)
 Aleksandar Kirovski  7 (2011-13)
 Branko Klenkovski  204/15 (1965-74)
 Aleksandar Kocić   101 (1998-2001)
 Saša Kocić 7/0 (2001-02)
 Dragić Komadina 44/1 (1982-84,1987-89)
 Marko Konatar  1/0 (2020)
 Ognjen Koroman 73/13 (2007-09)
 Bora Kostić    341/230 (1951-61,1962-66)
 Aleksandar Kovačević 55/0 (2008,2013-15)
 Darko Kovačević   62/45 (1994-96)
 Nenad Kovačević 135/1 (2002-06,2011)
 Stevan Kovačević 1/1 (1966-68)
 Zlatko Krdžević 110/3 (1984-89)
 Aleksandar Kristić   84/1 (1991-94,1997-98)
 Miodrag Krivokapić  122/1 (1983-88)
 Radovan Krivokapić    119/14 (2002-06)
 Petar Krivokuća  191/13 (1968-76)
 Srboljub Krivokuća 124 (1952-57)
 Zlatko Krmpotić 229/8 (1977-86)
 Jovan Krneta 29/1 (2011-14)
 Darko Krsteski 13/0 (1997-99)
 Nenad Krstičić 63/6 (2017-19, 2021-)
 Milan Krstić 13/1 (1945-47)
 Nikola Krstović 12/2 (2019-)
 Nebojša Krupniković  92/55 (1991-93,1994-96)
 Lajčo Kujundžić 7/1 (1949-51)

L
 Dragan Lacmanović 2/0 (1983)
 Nenad Lalatović    118/5 (1997,1999-2002)
 Vojin Lazarević    214/134 (1966-70,1972-74)
 Marko Lazetić 1/0 (2020)
 Nikola Lazetić 74/3 (1995-97,2008-10)
 Darko Lazić 37/1 (2013-15)
 Miroslav Lazić 4/0 (1953-55)
 Darko Lazović 142/34 (2009-15)
 Damien Le Tallec 104/7 (2016-18)
 Miroslav Lečić 1/0 (2004)
 Dejan Lekić  37/16 (2009-10)
 Dragoje Leković  27 (1991-92)
 Leo Lerinc 112/12 (1999-2002)
 Milan Lešnjak 6/0 (1993-94)
 Darko Ljubojević 45/7 (1995-97)
 Živan Ljukovčan  126 (1977-81,1984-86)
 Ljubomir Lovrić 100 (1945-52)
 João Lucas 23/1 (2007-08)
 Dušan Lukić  74/3 (1976-79)
 Vladan Lukić 96/41 (1986-92)
 Aleksandar Luković 148/12 (2002-06,2015-17)
 Andrija Luković 7/0 (2016-17)

M
 Nebojša Maksimović 16/1 (1993-94)
 Nikola Maksimović 35/1 (2012-13)
 Luka Malešev   51/6 (1961-63)
 Zoran Mališević 15/1 (1981-82)
 Danilo Mandić 1/0 (1976-77)
 Filip Manojlović 33 (2016-17)
 Dušan Maravić  112/33 (1958-64)
 Marko Marin 58/11 (2018-20)
 Srboljub Marinković 2/0 (1979-81)
 Vinko Marinović 90/10 (1995-99)
 Jovan Markoski 7/0 (2000-01)
 Aleksandar Marković  75/1 (1964-71)
 Marjan Marković   185/11 (2000-05,2008-09)
 Predrag Marković 4/0 (1956-57)
 Saša Marković 12/14 (1998)
 Slobodan Marović    171/5 (1986-91)
 Milan Martinović 17/0 (2001-02)
 Novak Martinović 8/0 (2013-14)
 Nenad Maslovar    73/25 (1992-94)
 Zoran Mašić 17/5 (1994-96)
 Vladimir Matijašević   42/0 (200-02)
 Bruno Matos 7/1 (2015-16)
 Mamadou Mbodj 10/1 (2014-15)
 Dejan Meleg 7/0 (2018)
 Vojislav Melić   189/20 (1960-67)
 Bruno Mezenga 18/5 (2011)
 Dragan Mićić 104/36 (1996-2000)
 Danijel Mihajlović 4/0 (2010-11)
 Siniša Mihajlović  66/19 (1990-92)
 Stefan Mihajlović 7/0 (2012-14)
 Trifun Mihajlović   105/20 (1964-74)
 Nikola Mijailović  55/4 (2008,2013-15)
 Srđan Mijailović 69/0 (2010-13)
 Dušan Mijatović 1/0 (1946-47)
 Nikola Mijušković 16/3 (1960)
 Nikola Mikić 85/8 (2010-13)
 Boban Miladinov 1/0 (1986-87)
 Bojan Miladinović  35/1 (2004-08)
 Branko Milanović 8/1 (1958-59)
 Dragan Miletović     176/1 (1978-85)
 Đorđe Milić 8/1 (1966-67)
 Ljubomir Milić 1/0 (1963-64)
 Nemanja Milić 48/5 (2017-18)
 Svetislav Milić 5/0 (1949-54)
 Tomislav Milićević 129/2 (1960-68)
 Nenad Milijaš 251/68 (2006-09,2012-14,2017-19)
 Ivica Milivojev 19/5 (1995-96)
 Luka Milivojević 47/7 (2012-13)
 Nenad Miljković 12/1 (1998-2000)
 Goran Milojević 138/12 (1982-88)
 Ljubiša Milojević 11/1 (1989-91)
 Vladan Milojević    15/0 (1995-96)
 Zvonko Milojević    203 (1989-97)
 Nedeljko Milosavljević  138/15 (1977-85)
 Slobodan Milosavljević 2/1 (1961-62)
 Selimir Milošević  95/39 (1958-66)
 Stefan Milošević 3/0 (2016-18)
 Dejan Milovanović  231/28 (2001-08,2010-11)
 Đorđe Milovanović 166/12 (1978-85)
 Luka Milunović 61/14 (2012-14)
 Nemanja Milunović 69/7(2019-)
 Miljan Miljanić 13/0 (1951-57)
 Marko Mirić 24/1 (2012-13)
 Đorđe Mirković 2/1 (1946-48)
 Vladislav Mirković 29/7 (1999-2004)
 Slobodan Miškov 6/1 (1948)
 Blagoje Mitić 39/1 (1959-64)
 Milovan Mitić 1/0 (1970)
 Rajko Mitić  294/109  (1945-58)
 Slobodan Mitić 5/0 (1964-66)
 Zoran Mitić 1/0 (1979-80)
 Borisav Mitrović 1/0 (1979-80)
 Marko Mitrović 2/0  (1995-96)
 Dragan Mladenović 92/13 (2002-04,2005-06)
 Filip Mladenović   60/3 (2012-13)
 Rade Mojović 1 (1994-95)
 Mauricio Molina 19/3 (2007-08)
 Ivica Momčilović 49/2 (1990-91,1992-93)
 Pablo Mouche 14/0 (2016)
 Dragan Mrđa 82/31 (2001-05,2013-14)
 Andrej Mrkela 2/0 (2008-09)
 Mitar Mrkela  208/46 (1983-90)
 Srđan Mrkušić 74  (1946-53)
 Vladimir Mudrinić 50/1 (2004-06)
 Ognjen Mudrinski 25/12 (2012-13)
 Marko Mugoša 1/0 (2010)
 Husref Musemić 110/38 (1985-89)
 Marko Muslin 3/0 (2003)
 Slavoljub Muslin  183/5 (1975-81)
 Ibrahim Mustapha 12/0 (2022-)

N
 Ilija Najdoski 162/8 (1988-92)
 Velimir Naumović 5/0 (1953-55)
 Saša Nedeljković 17/0 (1992-93)
 Goran Negić 1/0 (1988-90)
 Ljubo Nenadić 4/0 (2012-14)
 Branko Nešović 67/0 (1948-58)
 Dragan Nikitović 19/0 (1974-79)
 Dragan Nikolić 1/0 (1981)
 Dušan Nikolić 154/5 (1970-80)
 Jovica Nikolić 115/15 (1983-89)
 Marko Nikolić 1/0 (2006-07)
 Nemanja Nikolić 37/1 (2008-10)
 Veljko Nikolić 40/4  (2018-)
 Vladimir Nikolovski 9/3 (1958-60)
 Pavle Ninkov 110/3 (2008-11)
 Miloš Ninković 33/5 (2013-14)
 Zoran Njeguš 103/13 (1995-98)
 Mile Novković 148/5 (1969-78)

O
 Dragan Obradović 1/0 (1959-62)
 Richard Odada 2/0 (2021-)
 Tihomir Ognjanov 88/29 (1949-53)
 Konstantin Ognjanović 13/4 (1993-94,1995-96)
 Perica Ognjenović 126/37 (1994-98)
 Radivoj Ognjanović 19/6(1962-63)
 Ifeanyi Onyilo 8/0 (2013-14)
 Sanibal Orahovac 45/7 (2001-04)
 Petar Orlandić 34/15 (2015-17)
 Mikloš Orsag 6/0 (1975-76)
 Stevan Ostojić 171/75 (1965-71)
 Aboubakar Oumarou 15/2 (2008-09)
 Ognjen Ožegović 4/0 (2012-13)

P
 Vinícius Pacheco 2/0 (2011-12)
 Bela Palfi 99/9 (1948-53)
 Aleksandar Panajotović 88/27 (1970-76)
 Darko Pančev 141/116 (1988-92)
 Radovan Pankov 54/3 (2019-)
 Marko Pantelić 60/33 (2004-05)
 Miodrag Pantelić 139/25 (1996-2000)
 Aleksandar Pantić 28/0 (2006-08)
 Aleksandar Pantić 15/1 (2012-13)
 Miloš Pantović 1/0 (2019)
 Bernard Parker 18/6 (2009)
 Josh Parker 14/4 (2015-16)
 Savo Pavićević 63/2 (2014-16)
 Milan Pavkov  80/26(2017-)
 Bojan Pavlović 6 (2009-10)
 Miroslav Pavlović  264/3 (1967-74)
 Zoran Pavlović 36/5 (1980-82,1986,1988-89)
 Srđan Pecelj 59/1 (1995-95,1997-99)
 Vladimir Pečenčić 16/15 (1945-46)
 Nejc Pečnik 51/11 (2013-14)
 Nemanja Pejčinović 15/0 (2009)
 Nino Pekarić 4/0 (2008-09)
 Dojčin Perazić 1/0 (1968-70)
 Marko Perović 123/12 (2002-08,2012)
 Marko Perović 41/8 (1994-95)
 Slavko Perović 60/14 (2009-11)
 Željko Perović 5/0 (1998-99)
 Aleksandar Pešić 51/29 (2017-18)
 Dejan Pešić 5 (1997-02)
 Miladin Pešterac 19/0 (1982-85)
 Dejan Petković 140/39 (1992-95)
 Marko Petković 107/4 (2013-17)
 Nikola Petković 25/0 (2008,2011-13)
 Aleksandar Petrović 1/0 (1952)
 Mihailo Petrović 7/0 (1977-79)
 Miodrag Mališa Petrović 1 (1945-48)
 Miomir Petrović 60/0 (1945-48)
 Njegoš Petrović 51/2(2019-)
 Ognjen Petrović 144/3 (1967-76)
 Vladimir Petrović   332/66 (1972-82)
 Thomas Phibel 17/0 (2016)
 Darko Pivaljević 7/2 (1994-95)
 Mihailo Pjanović 148/92 (1999-2003)
 Bogdan Planić 6/0 (2014-15)
 Srđan Plavšić 73/10 (2015-17)
 Dražen Podunavac 24/2 (1995-96)
 Marko Poletanović 28/4 (2016-17)
 Radojko Popadić 4/0 (1957-59)
 Goran Popov 3/0 (2004)
 Dragan Popović 6/1 (1963-64)
 Ivan Popović 43/17 (1955-61)
 Miodrag Popović 8/0 (1945-46)
 Vladica Popović  291/10 (1953-65)
 Zoran Popović  22/(7)/15 c.s (2018-)
 Zoran Prljinčević 71/51 (1962-65)
 Robert Prosinečki 161/35 (1987-91)
 Yegor Prutsev 1/0 (2022-)
 Nikola Prvulović 24 (1953-55)
 Petar Puača 14/4 (1996)
 Dragan Punišić 12/1 (1987-88)
 Milan Purović 56/23 (2005-07)

R
 Dragomir Racić 35 (1966-71,1973-75)
 Uroš Račić 45/3 (2016-18)
 Petar Radenković 1 (1952)
 Pavle Radić 2/0 (1949-51)
 Rade Radić 1/0 (1969)
 Zvonko Radić 1/0 (1979-81)
 Duško Radinović 165/13 (1989-93)
 Saša Radivojević 16 (2006-08)
 Nikola Radmanović 118/1 (1992-96)
 Dušan Radonjić 2/0 (1962-63)
 Nemanja Radonjić  47/11 (2017-18)
 Predrag Radosavljević - Preki 1/0 (1982-85)
 Vladan Radosavljević 1/0 (1992-93)
 Zoran Radosavljević 22/0 (1996-97)
 Miodrag Radošević 3/0 (1957-60)
 Slavko Radovanović 127/10 (1980-83,1985-89)
 Aleksandar Radović 1/0 (2005-06)
 Branko Radović 121/1 (1969-77)
 Jovica Raduka 2/0 (1973-75)
 Andrija Radulović 13/2(2020-)
 Tatomir Radunović 10 (1958-59)
 Milovan Rajevac 14/0 (1978-79)
 Milenko Rajković 42/1 (1980-83)
 Predrag Rajković 37(2013-15)
 Đorđe Rakić 21/7 (2013-15)
 Živan Rakić 11/0 (1967-69)
 Ivan Ranđelović 174 (2001-08)
 Blažo Raosavljević 3/0 (1992-93)
 Branko Rašić 1/0 (1993-94)
 Petar Rašić 1/0 (1961)
 Milanko Rašković 49/11 (2005-08)
 Nikola Rašković 1/0 (1954)
 Milorad Ratković 45/7 (1990-92)
 Radivoje Ratković 48/8 (1973-77)
 Miloš Reljić 2/1 (2006-07)
 Stevan Reljić 26/2 (2010-11)
 Zoran Rendulić 25/1 (2015-17)
 Srebrenko Repčić 120/31 (1979-83)
 Ricardinho 9/1 (2017)
 Mihailo Ristic 91/7 (2013-17)
 Zoran Riznić 9/2 (1995)
 Omega Roberts 3/0 (2013)
 Milan Rodić 126/4(2017-)
 Anton Rudinski 195/79 (1953-62)
 John Jairo Ruiz 35/6 (2016-17)

S
 Nenad Sakić 103/2 (1994-97)
 Franklin Salas 7/0 (2007-08)
 Sékou Sanogo 22/0 (2020-)
 Boris Savić 1/0 (2006)
 Dušan Savić   258/149 (1973-82)
 Duško Savić 8/0 (1991-92)
 Lenko Savić 1/0 (1958-61)
 Miodrag Savić 6/1 (1945-46)
 Radomir Savić 50/7 (1979-83)
 Vujadin Savić 83/1 (2009-10,2017-19)
 Dejan Savićević  118/41 (1988-92,1999)
 Vukan Savićević 51/6 (2012-15)
 Sávio 49/4 (2009-11)
 Predrag Sikimić 51/12 (2015-17)
 Fabio Silva 2/0 (2005-06)
 Jeff Silva 8/0 (2009-10)
 Dragan Simeunović 41 (1976-78,1980-82)
 Milan Simeunović 36 (1987,1992-96)
 Veljko Simić 62/15(2018-20)
 Zoran Simić 8/1 (1978-79)
 Nikola Skerlić 2/0 (1945-46)
 Slobodan Slović 12/0 (1998-99)
 Ibrahim Somé Salombo 19/4 (2008-09)
 Ljubiša Spajić  216/11 (1945-46,1952-60)
 Uroš Spajić 19/0 (2010,2012-13)
 Darko Spalević 17/0 (2001-02)
 Srđan Spiridonović 24/4 (2020)
 Nenad Srećković 2/0 (2006-07)
 Vojislav Srdić 12/1 (1957-58)
 Slavoljub Srnić 125/21 (2010-11,2015-18,2021-)
 Saša Stamenković 94 (2008-11)
 Srboljub Stamenković 58/18 (1975-81)
 Dragan Stančić  9/0 (2004-05,2007)
 Momčilo Stanić 1/0 (1952)
 Aleksandar Stanković 5/2 (1945-46)
 Branko Stanković   243/17 (1945-58)
 Dejan Stanković 1/0 (1977)
 Dejan Stanković 114/38 (1995-98)
 Jovan Stanković 59/2 (1992-96)
 Predrag Stanković 65/8 (1994-96)
 Darko Stanojlović 8/1 (1996-97)
 Dejan Stefanović 77/10 (1993-95)
 Slavoljub Stefanović 5/0 (1947-48)
 Dragoslav Stepanović 34/2 (1973-76)
 Goran Stevanović (1979-80)
 Dragan Stevanović 34/9 (1999-2001)
 Nikola Stipić 118/24 (1956-66)
 Aleksandar Stojanović 184 (1976-83)
 Boban Stojanović 20/1 (1999-02)
 Dimitrije Stojanović 70/0 (1951-61)
 Dragan Stojanović 11/1 (1963-66)
 Ljubiša Stojanović 43/1 (1980-85)
 Miloš Stojanović 5/0 (2013-15)
 Mirko Stojanović 93 (1962-65)
 Nenad Stojanović 35/13 (2003-05)
 Saša Stojanović 20/2 (2015-16)
 Stevan Stojanović 168 (1983-90)
 Goran Stojiljković 22/10 (1994-95)
 Nikola Stojiljković 15/5 (2018)
 Dragan Stojković 159/65 (1986-90)
 Filip Stojković 96/2 (2011-12,2017-19)
 Nikola Stojković 1/0 (2013)
 Vladimir Stojković 29 (2001-03,2005-06)
 Mitko Stojkovski 123/3 (1991-95)
 Vlada Stošić 151/23 (1984-86,1988-91)
 Branimir Subašić 15/4 (2008-10)
 Rashid Sumaila 5/0 (2018-19)
 Nemanja Supić 6 (2015-19)
 Duško Suručić 1/0 (1988-89)
 Sead Sušić 104/27 (1970-78)
 Takayuki Suzuki 9/2 (2006)

Š
 Refik Šabanadžović    88/5 (1987-91)
 Momčilo Šapinac (1945-48)
 Dragan Šarac 39/1 (2003-05)
 Dragomir Šećerov 35/14 (1946-48)
 Dragoslav Šekularac  203/37 (1955-66)
 Mirko Šekularac 23/0 (1960-64)
 Miloš Šestić   277/62  (1974-84)
 Vasilije Šijaković 19/2 (1952-54)
 Mirnes Šišić 13/0 (2009)
 Dalibor Škorić 62/14 (1997-2000)
 Slobodan Škrbić 116/3 (1961-71)
 Ištvan Šorban 4/0 (1965-66)
 Miroslav Šugar 92/2 (1982-86)

T
 Ely Tadeu 12/0 (2006-07)
 Dimitrije Tadić 77/4 (1948-55)
 Josip Takač 29/7 (1948-50)
 Miroslav Tanjga 32/1 (1991-92)
 Lazar Tasić 189/22 (1954-61)
 Momčilo Tasić 3/2 (1946-47)
 Aleksa Terzić 2/0 (2018-19)
 Vladimir Tintor 11/0 (2004-05)
 Tomané 32/8 (2019-20)
 Kosta Tomašević 151/137 (1945-54)
 Novak Tomić 138/3 (1954-64)
 Nenad Tomović 43/1 (2006-09)
 Ivan Toplak 120/70 (1954-60)
 Duško Tošić 53/2 (2010-12)
 Rade Tošić 18/0 (1990-92)
 Nikola Trajković 50/2 (2005-09)
 Ivan Tričkovski 31/4 (2007-09)
 Miloš Trifunović 33/14 (2010-11)
 Aleksandar Trišović 31/1 (2006-08)
 Zdravko Tumbin 1/0 (1949-55)
 Đorđe Tutorić 81/2 (2006-08,2009-10)

U
 Zoran Urumov 4/0 (1995-96,1998-99)

V

 Rajiv van La Parra 11/1 (2019-20)
 Nenad Vanić 43/4 (1996-97)
 Goran Vasilijević 132/8 (1988-94)
 Nikola Vasiljević 7/0 (2009-11)
 Velibor Vasović 14/0 (1963)
 Dragiša Veljković 13/0 (1947-48)
 Idan Vered 10/1 (2015)
 Stevan Veselinov 43/13 (1953-56)
 Miloš Vesić  5 (2011-14)
 Marko Vešović 110/4 (2010-13)
 Risto Vidaković 77/20 (1992-94)
 Nemanja Vidić 92/15 (2001-04)
 Hugo Vieira 51/28 (2015-16)
 Milan Vilotić 62/3 (2009-12)
 Ede Višinka 15/1 (1996-97)
 Milivoje Vitakić 138/3 (1998-2004)
 Aleksandar Vlahović 5/1 (1993-94)
 Sorin Vlaicu 16/0 (1992-93)
 Zoran Vorotović 12/0 (1986-87)
 Ognjen Vranješ 5/0 (2008-09)
 Branimir Vratnjan 19/1 (1965-67)
 Vanja Vučićević 2/0 (2016-17)
 Srđan Vujaklija 10/2 (2017)
 Zoran Vujović 17/0 (1989-90)
 Aleksa Vukanović 65/12(2019-)
 Dragomir Vukićević 56 (1959-63)
 Ivan Vukomanović 68/3 (1999-2001)
 Branislav Vukosavljević 97/47 (1947-53)
 Jagoš Vuković 1/0 (2005-06)
 Dragan Vulević 18/6 (1996-97)
 Miloš Vulić 40/6 (2019-20)

W
 Willians Bartolomeu 7/2 (1998)

Z
 Aleksandar Zarić 2/0 (1950-55)
 Branko Zebec 34/5 (1959-61)
 Miljan Zeković  225/1 (1951-60)
 Miralem Zjajo 5/0 (1985-86)
 Siniša Zlatković 91/11 (1950-55)
 Saša Zorić 26/1 (2000-01)
 Ivan Zvekanović 25/0 (1950-52)

Ž
 Nikola Žigić  110/71 (2003-06)
 Milan Živadinović 7/1 (1963-68)
 Goran Živanović  2 (1979-83)
 Todor Živanović   89/67 (1948-58)
 Bratislav Živković  134/9 (1994-98)
 Dragoljub Živković 26/2 (1964-69)
 Marjan Živković 1/0 (1992-93)
 Milan Živković 1/0 (1993)
 Richairo Živković 0/0 (2021-)
 Radoslav Žugić  10/3 (1981-85)
 Dragoljub Župac 3/2 (1951-53)

Players without an official appearance

  Addoquaye Addo  (2008)
  Keti Agošten (1946)
  Nemanja Ahčin (2012-16)
  Nenad Andrijević (1982)
  Vojislav Antić (1967)
  Dejan Antonić (1988)
  Ljuba Antonović (1949)
  Ljubija Arsenović (1949)
  Alexander Arsovic (2001)
  Khalid Aucho  (2017)
  Mehmed Avdagić (1973)
  Sava Avramović (1969)
  Branko Babić (1969)
  Slobodan Baćić (1999)
  Dušan Bakić (1949)
  Miroslav Balašćak (1973)
  Stevan Balov (1958-59)
  Severin Bijelić (1945)
  Vladan Binić (2010-12)
  Ljubivoje Bliznaković (1956)
  Mile Bogdanović (1946)
  Vid Bokan(1966-67)
  Ilija Borenović 
  Vlada Božić (1948)
  Željko Brnčić (1977)
  Predrag Bubanja (1968)
  Ivan Bunjevac (1954)
  Mirko Bunjevčević (2000-01)
  Zoran Čikić (1978)
  Bora Čubrilo (1959)
  Zoran Ćinkul (1978)
  Čedomir Ćirković (1958)
  Nikola Demić (1954)
  Vlado Divić (1967-68)
  Bobby Dragaš
  Josif Dragišić (1956-58)
  Ljubiša Drenovaković (1970-71)
  Obrad Drobnjak (1972-74)
  Branislav Đurić (1973)
  Fallou Fall (2022)
  Ivan Fileš (1983-85)
  Ljubiša Filipović (1945)
  Fumaça (1998–99)
  Vojislav Gaković (1955-57)
  Vlastimir Golubičić (1945)
 Guiba (1997–98)
  Đorđe Hadžikostić (1958)
  Bogoljub Hristić (1966)
  Veljko Hutolarević (1951-53)
  Dragoljub Ilić (1966)
  Žika Jakovljević (1948)
  Aleksandar Jakšić (1973)
  Igor Jančevski
  Milorad Jocić (1954-56)
  Vladimir Jocić (1976)
  Živko Josić (1952)
  Branislav Jovanović (1976)
 Miodrag Jovanović (1945)
  Miodrag Kačarević (1948)
  Jovan Kašanin (1949-50)
 Andrija Katić (2019-)
  Dušan Kljajić (1982-83)
  Mile Kos (1946)
  Dušan Lazarević (1969-71)
  Miladin Lazić (1974-75)
  Milan Lazić (1976)
  Radivoje Lukić (1971)
  Stevan Luković (2013-14)
  Zvonko Ljubenko (1952)
  Aleksandar Madžar
  Boban Maksimović (2008)
  Božidar Marjanović (1977)
  Đorđe Marjanović (1983,85)
  Nikola Marjanović (1975)
  Stanislav Martinović (1961)
  Ilija Matić (1948)
  Jovica Matić (1966)
  Saša Milanović (1979)
  Blagoja Milevski (1991)
  Dragan Milojević (1973)
  Milenko Milošević (1996-97)
  Sava Milošević (1951-52)
  Predrag Milovanović (1978)
  Adam Mitchell (2016)
  Petar Mitrović (1954)
  Vladan Mladenović (1955-56)
  Risto Načevski (1947)
  Branislav Nedeljković (1969)
  Čedomir Nešković (1962)
  Ljubinko Nikodijević (1966)
  Ivan Ognjanov (1976)
  Miodrag Odavić (1969-70)
  Almin Osmanagić
  Mario Ostojić 
  Miloš Ostojić (1966)
  Vladimir Pančić(1947)
  Milan Pantelić (1966-67)
  Milutin Pantelić (1952)
  Dragan Pavlović
  Svetozar Pavlović
  Svetozar Pejčinović
  Ivan Pejović
  Nebojša Peković
  Zvonko Perović
  Đorđe Pešić
  Nebojša Petković
  Sreten Petković
  Dušan Petrović
  Vladimir Pljevaljčić 
  Živko Popadić
  Dragan Popović (born 1953)
  Dragan Popović (born 1961)
  Marino Pušić (1991)
  Vlada Radičević
  Mileta Radojević
  Svetislav Radosavljević
  Miroslav Radovanović
  Miodrag Radović 
  Slobodan Radović
  Aleksandar Rodić
  Branko Roškar
  Gbolahan Salami
  Zlatibor Savić
  Nenad Seferović
  Marko Simeunovič
  Slavko Simić
  Dragomir Skerlić
  Živko Sokolovski
  Živorad Spasojević
 Aleksandar Stanković(2017-)
  Josif Stebih
  Dragomir Stepović
  Miloš Stoilković
  Dragiša Stojanović
  Miodrag Stokić
  Subotić
  Nermin Šabić
  Duško Tomić
  Slavko Tošić
  Ivan Trutin
  Milijan Tupajić
  Gligor Uzunov
  Živko Vasiljev
  Dragan Vasiljević
 Nikola Vasiljević(2019-)
  Miroslav Veličković
  Pavle Veličković
  Dragan Veljković
  Mateus Viveiros
  Nenad Vranješ
  Božidar Vučković
  Branislav Vukadinović
  Goran Vukićević
  Dragan Vukmirović
  Zé Marcos
  Goran Zelenović
  Predrag Zeljić
  Milan Zlatanović
  Denuc Žurka (1982)

Guests
Players from other clubs that have played with Red Star in unofficial games as guest players:

  Milan Bačvarević – Trepča
  Dušan Bajević – Velež Mostar
  Radoslav Bečejac – Partizan
  Rudolf Belin – Dinamo Zagreb
  Stjepan Bobek – Partizan (1947)
  Vujadin Boškov – Vojvodina
  Božo Broketa – Hajduk (1948)
  Josip Bukal – Željezničar Sarajevo
  Željko Čajkovski – Dinamo Zagreb (1948)
  Đorđe Čokić – Radnički Beograd
  Slobodan Dogandžić – Sloboda Užice
  Andon Dončevski – Vardar Skopje
  Milan Galić – Partizan
  Dragan Gugleta – OFK Beograd
  Fuad Hajrović – Sloboda Tuzla
  Aleksandar Ivoš – Vojvodina
  Jurica Jerković – Hajduk Split (1977)
  Josip Katalinski – Željezničar Sarajevo
  Abid Kovačević – Borac Banja Luka
  Vladica Kovačević – Partizan
  Blagomir Krivokuća – OFK Beograd
  Milan Ljubenović – Radnički Beograd
  Frane Matošić – Hajduk Split (1948)
  Muhamed Mujić – Velež Mostar
  Vahidin Musemić – FK Sarajevo
  Branko Oblak – Olimpija Ljubljana
  Ljubomir Ognjanović – Radnički Niš
  Đorđe Pavlić – Vojvodina
  Aleksandar Petaković – Radnički Beograd
  Ilija Petković – OFK Beograd
  Zoran Prljinčević – Radnički Beograd
  Tomislav Prosen – Maribor
  Ljubiša Rajković – Radnički Niš
  Ivica Reiss – Dinamo Zagreb
  Spasoje Samardžić – OFK Beograd
  Uroš Savković – Budućnost Titograd
  Josip Skoblar – OFK Beograd
  Josip Srebrov – Vardar Skopje
  Nenad Šalov – Hajduk Split
  Vasilije Šijaković – OFK Beograd
  Edhem Šljivo – FK Sarajevo (1977)
  Marko Valok – Partizan
  Todor Veselinović – Vojvodina
  Blagoje Vidinić – Radnički Beograd
  Slaviša Žungul – Hajduk Split

Notes
It is possible that some players that have participated in European competition matches or in the domestic cup, in the seasons Red Star was not the winner, are missing (as of 9 August 2010)

The players that played during Yugoslav period have represented the flag that would correspond to the current countries, that were the correspondent Yugoslav republics back then.

See also
 List of FK Partizan players
 List of FK Vojvodina players

References

External sources
 Championship winning squads at Red Star official website
 Cup winning squads at Red Star official website
 All-time players at redstarbelgrade.info
 1946-1991 League squads
 Players without official appearance at redstarbelgrade.info

 
Lists of association football players by club in Serbia
Belgrade-related lists
Lists of Serbian sportspeople
Association football player non-biographical articles